Bosporus Germans are those ethnic Germans living and settled in Istanbul since the second half of the 19th century.

Nineteenth century
The first generation came a few decades before and (especially) during the three political visits of Kaiser Wilhelm II to Constantinople (Istanbul), the capital city of the Ottoman Empire (on 21 October 1889, and on 5 October 1898, as the guest of Sultan Abdülhamid II; and on 15 October 1917, as the guest of Sultan Mehmed V). The Taksim German Hospital was founded by three nurses and opened in 1852. Most of the initial German settlers in Istanbul were craftsmen, industrialists and soldiers. Baron Colmar Freiherr von der Goltz, also known as Goltz Pasha, who was the chief advisor of the Ottoman Army from 1883 to 1896; and General Otto Liman von Sanders, who was a successful commander of the Ottoman Army during World War I, may be the most famous of them in the military field. 

Some of the most beautiful Bosporus villas, such as the Krupp and Huber Villa; or the German Fountain (1900) and Haydarpaşa Railway Station (1908) in Istanbul remain as evidence of the German influence in the late Ottoman Empire. Most of the German engineers and craftsmen who worked at the construction site of the Haydarpaşa Train Station later established a small German neighbourhood in the nearby Yeldeğirmeni quarter of the Kadıköy district, on the Asian side of Istanbul. Previously, the German architect August Jachmund had designed the  Sirkeci Train Station (1890) on the European side of Istanbul, and the nearby Deutsche Orient Bank Headquarters (1890) in the Sirkeci quarter, within the boundaries of the Eminönü district, during the last year (1889-1890) of Otto von Bismarck's  chancellorship.  Both of these train stations would play an important role in the  Berlin-Istanbul-Baghdad Railway project, which would enhance the economic and political ties between the  German and  Ottoman empires and allow Germany to by-pass the British-controlled Suez Canal when reaching the lucrative markets and resources of the Orient by extending the railway line further south to the port of Basra on the Persian Gulf.

There were also many Germans in Istanbul who supported the Young Turk movement of the early-20th century and nurtured the Young Turks' relationship with the Social Democratic Party of Germany (SPD) as well as with the German Liberals around Friedrich Naumann (1860-1919). From the circle around Naumann came  Ernest Jäckh (1875–1959), purveyor of Young Turk propaganda (and later professor at Columbia University.) Jäckh however did not live in Constantinople for too long and can't be considered a "Bosporus German" in the "true" sense. Another visitor to Constantinople during the First World War was Theodor Heuss, a friend of Naumann and Jäckh, who designed the German Cultural Centre in Constantinople and later became the first Federal President of Germany (in office from 1949 until 1959). Active Social Democrats in Constantinople included Alexander Parvus (1867–1924) (in the city from 1910–1914), and Dr. Friedrich Schrader (1865–1922) (known as "İştiraki" {translation: Socialist}, active 1891-1918).

In his book "Flüchtlingsreise", Schrader describes the preliminary end of the German community in Istanbul, when, according to Article 19 of the  1918 ceasefire agreement between the Ottoman Empire and the Entente powers, Germans and Austrians were to be expelled within one month. Some, like Schrader, tried to avoid detention and subsequent deportation by fleeing to Germany via Odessa and the war-torn Ukraine. Some Germans could stay, for example Paul Lange (1857-1919), the Master of the Sultan's Music, with his immediate family, who were however deported in May 1920 shortly after Lange was buried in Istanbul in a state funeral with great pomp in one of the last major events of the dying Ottoman Sultanate of 1299-1922.

Twentieth century
The second generation came as refugees fleeing the Third Reich. The former Mayor of Berlin Ernst Reuter (1889–1953) and his son Edzard, later the president of Daimler-Chrysler may be some of the best known. Austrian architect Clemens Holzmeister (1886–1983) was also effectively in exile in Turkey. Among them were also many poorer Germans who lived in Anatolia in poverty and despair. They called themselves Haymatloz (in German: Heimatlos for homelandless), according to a stamp the Turkish authorities printed in their passports.

Twenty-first century
Currently there is a "third generation" of various expatriates. One of the most famous members of the current German community in Turkey is the football trainer Christoph Daum (1953- ).

The Deutsche Schule Istanbul (1868) and St. George's Austrian High School (1882) are well-attended German-language schools in the city. Istanbul Lisesi (1884) is a Turkish high school which teaches in German as the primary foreign language and is likewise recognized as a Deutsche Auslandsschule (German international school) by Germany.

Istanbulites with West European roots are in general called Levantines (originally a term used for describing the Genoese, Venetian and French traders operating -and settled- in the East Mediterranean, i.e. the Levant), apart from the Sephardic Jews who migrated to the Ottoman Empire from the Iberian peninsula following the Spanish Inquisition in 1492 and eventually became Turkish citizens, and the local Greeks (the most influential of whom were known as the Phanariots) whose numbers have dwindled due to the often tense political disputes between Turkey and Greece, and in part because of economic hardships. There is also a small number of Polish families organized in Polonezköy (or Adampol as it is alternatively called), a village on the Asian side of the Bosporus which is famous for its lush green nature and dairy products.

References 

European diaspora in Turkey
German diaspora
Ethnic groups in Istanbul
German expatriates in Turkey

German expatriates in the Ottoman Empire
German diaspora in Asia